Sir Ivor Henry Thomas Hele, CBE (13 June 1912 – 1 December 1993) was an Australian artist noted for portraiture. He was Australia's longest serving war artist and completed more commissioned works than any other in the history of Australian art.

Biography
Hele was born in Edwardstown, South Australia, the youngest of four children of Arthur Hele and his wife Ethel May Hele, née Thomas, later moving to 13 Brown Street (now part of Morphett Street), Adelaide. He attended Westbourne Park Primary School for a short time, then Prince Alfred College, where at age eight he began art classes under James Ashton, the drawing master. In 1923 his painting "The Bedouin" was a prize winner at a London exhibition. In 1924 he started studies at the South Australian School of Arts and Crafts under Miss M. Kelly and completed his first year with honours. He was awarded three first class certificates at the Royal Drawing Society's Art Exhibition in 1924, and Princess Louise's Prize at their exhibition the following year.
In 1926 he was admitted to the South Australian Society of Arts, their youngest member. Apart from his art studies (three nights a week and on Saturdays), he had a normal boy's interest in sport, and satisfactory academic results.

He returned to Australia early in 1930. 
He was to return to Paris and Bavaria three years later, as a married man.

At age 20 Hele married Jean Berry, a prominent women's basketball player and official. They renovated the isolated and rambling Hotel Aldinga on the Old Coach Road, abandoned after construction of the Main South Road and the population centre of Aldinga   moving to the seaside.

In 1936 his painting The Proclamation won first prize in a competition to mark the Centenary of South Australia.

In 1938 a major work, Sturt's Reluctant Decision to Return won the Commonwealth sesquicentenary prize of 250 guineas (perhaps AUD 20,000 in today's money). The picture was purchased by the Government for the future National Gallery of Australia, but is rather to be found at the Art Gallery of South Australia.

Encouraged by Thomas Blamey, who had been impressed by the Sturt painting and with a promise of support for his artistic career, Hele enlisted as a private soldier in the 2nd AIF and in June 1940 sailed for the Middle East with the 2/48th Battalion, 9th Australian Division. On 9 January 1941 Blamey met him personally; he was promoted to lieutenant with responsibilities as a war artist, given a truck and batman-driver and instructed to join the 6th Division in its push to Tobruk. Around June 1941 he joined the Military History and Information Section of the AIF, under John Treloar, which had a studio in Heliopolis, which he shared with Lyndon Dadswell and John Dowie. He was appointed an official war artist on 11 October 1941 with the rank of captain. He returned to Australia with the 6th and 7th Divisions and by April was back at Aldinga, and started on his ambitious series of paintings based on his extensive portfolio of sketches and paintings, many of which had in transit been accidentally ruined. Treloar, impatient with Hele's progress called on Louis McCubbin, director of the Art Gallery of South Australia, to investigate; McCubbin expressed his satisfaction and Treloar was mollified.

He remained with the 9th Division, which was later transferred to New Guinea. After the war he returned to Aldinga, where from his extensive portfolio of sketches, he executed many of the paintings which are held by the Australian War Memorial. In 1952 he was appointed as a war artist to the Australian forces in Korea.

Apart from the figure studies and war scenes held by the Australian War Memorial for which he is best known, and the many portraits, Ivor Hele painted many landscapes, particularly of the rugged South Australian coast, and a great number of erotic drawings. The National Gallery of Australia holds around 130 of his works, mostly minor pieces, and the Art Gallery of South Australia a few dozen. His work was occasionally seen at The Advertiser's open-air art exhibitions, and very few one-man shows: in 1943, 1945, 1954 and finally 1970 at the John Martin's auditorium during the Festival of Arts. He taught many well-known Australian artists including Hugo Shaw.

Personal life
Hele had an older brother, Harold A. Hele (23 April 1908 – 19 December 1941), and twin sisters, Beryl, who married Alf Head on 4 October 1930, and Phyllis Hele, who married Jack Dew Laurenti on 3 March 1937. A niece, sculptor Marcia Rankin, inherited Hele's sketchbooks, which she presented to the Australian War Memorial.

On 24 March 1932, Hele married Millicent Mary Jean Berry, a school teacher, at the Manse, Germein Street, Semaphore, South Australia. They divorced in 1957 and he married June Weatherly. Hele was severely self-critical and only ever held two exhibitions of his work, in 1931 and 1958.  He was a perfectionist who often burned paintings he was dissatisfied with.

Hele died in the South Australian suburb of Bedford Park and was cremated.

Works and awards
He was commissioned to paint the opening of Federal Parliament by the Queen during her visit in 1954.
He painted portraits of Prime Ministers Sir William McMahon and Malcolm Fraser, which are hanging in the New Parliament House in Canberra.
His portrait of Sir Thomas Blamey is held by the Australian War Memorial, as is one of Tom Derrick VC., with whom Hele had trained in 1940.
His portrait of Sir Lyell McEwin, longtime leader of the South Australian Legislative Council, hangs in Parliament House, Adelaide. 
His portrait of Professor Chapman hangs in the University of Adelaide's Chapman Theatre.
The National Portrait Gallery holds his portraits of Claude Charlick, Sir Lloyd Dumas and Senator, Dame Nancy Buttfield.
The Art Gallery of South Australia holds Hele's portraits of Sir Hans Heysen and archivist Lyndon Dadswell, as well as his 1938 Sturt's reluctant decision to return.
The State Library of New South Wales has his 1957 self-portrait and a portrait of playwright Max Afford.
His portrait of Edward Hayward hangs in the Carrick Hill mansion built for that businessman, founder of John Martin's Christmas Pageant.
Portraits of Sir Donald Bradman and the Duke of Gloucester.

Archibald Prize
He won Australia's most prestigious portrait prize, the Archibald Prize five times, for these works in the following years:
 1951 – Laurie Thomas (held by the State Library of New South Wales)
 1953 - Sir Henry Simpson Newland, CBE, DSO, MS, FRCS
 1954 - Rt Hon Sir R. G. Menzies, PC, CH, QC, MP
 1955 – Robert Campbell Esq.
 1957 – Self Portrait

Melrose Prize
He won the Melrose Prize (awarded by the Royal South Australian Society of Arts for the Art Gallery of South Australia) three times:
 1935 – James Ferries Esq. (other portraits by him were of H. E. Fuller and Dr. Fenner).
 1936
 1939

Honours
 Officer of the Order of the British Empire (OBE), 1954 
 Commander of the Order of the British Empire (CBE), 1969
 Knight Bachelor (Kt), 1983
 A bronze bust of Hele by his niece Marcia Rankin, based on a photograph by C. T. Halmarick, is held by the Australian War Memorial.

References

External links
The Productive Artist
Search the National Gallery of Australia 

1912 births
1993 deaths
Korean War artists
Archibald Prize winners
Australian Knights Bachelor
Australian Commanders of the Order of the British Empire
World War II artists
Australian war artists
20th-century Australian painters
20th-century Australian male artists
Artists from Adelaide
Australian Army personnel of World War II
Australian Army officers
Australian male painters